William McFarlane was a footballer who played at inside-right for Burslem Port Vale in 1893.

Career
McFarlane joined Second Division side Burslem Port Vale in January 1893, making his debut in a 3–0 defeat at Walsall Town Swifts on 18 February that year. He made a further three appearances at the Athletic Ground, before being released at the end of the season.

Career statistics
Source:

References

English footballers
Association football inside forwards
Port Vale F.C. players
English Football League players
Year of birth missing
Year of death missing